Patricio Iván Spada (born 29 May 1993) is an Argentine professional footballer who plays as a forward for Deportivo Español.

Career
Spada played in the youth of San Lorenzo in Argentina and Peñarol in Uruguay. On 2 July 2014, Spada returned to his homeland with Almirante Brown of Primera B Metropolitana. Three appearances followed across the 2014 campaign, with his senior debut coming against Deportivo Merlo. January 2015 saw Spada join fellow third tier team Tristán Suárez. After appearing seven times for the Greater Buenos Aires outfit, Spada departed to Deportivo Español on 26 January 2016. He made his bow in March versus San Telmo, with just two further appearances following. Spada spent part of 2016–17 in Italy's Serie D with Abano.

Having featured in three matches in Italian football, Spada agreed a move back to Deportivo Español in Argentina in August 2017. He'd participate in ten fixtures in the next two seasons, which culminated with relegation to Primera C Metropolitana in 2018–19.

Career statistics
.

References

External links

1993 births
Living people
Footballers from Buenos Aires
Argentine footballers
Association football forwards
Argentine expatriate footballers
Expatriate footballers in Italy
Argentine expatriate sportspeople in Italy
Primera B Metropolitana players
Serie D players
Club Almirante Brown footballers
CSyD Tristán Suárez footballers
Deportivo Español footballers
Abano Calcio players